Paul Wyss (born 7 July 1928) is a Swiss politician (FDP). The former ice hockey player competed in the 1952 Winter Olympics as a member of the Swiss ice hockey team.

References
 Paul Wyss' profile at Sports Reference.com
 Paul Wyss at swissolympians.ch
 Paul Wyss at hls-dhs-dss.ch (German)

1928 births
Living people
Swiss politicians
Olympic ice hockey players of Switzerland
Ice hockey players at the 1952 Winter Olympics
Free Democratic Party of Switzerland politicians